Fernando Lúpiz (born 12 April 1953) is an Argentine fencer and actor. He competed at the 1972 and 1976 Summer Olympics. He later became known for playing Zorro on stage.

Early life
Lúpiz was born in Buenos Aires, Argentina on 12 April 1953. He is the son of fencer  Enrique Lúpiz and the great nephew of Argentine actor Fernando Ochoa. Lúpiz took interest in fencing from an early age.

Career
He became the Junior and Senior National champion in Argentina. In 1975, he placed fourth in the Pan American Games in Mexico. During his fencing career, he won two Silver Olimpia Awards in fencing; one in 1977 and one in 1979.

Acting career
In 1974, Lúpiz met American actor Guy Williams, who had retired from Hollywood and moved to Argentina. Together, the two men performed at the Real Madrid Circus where they put on a show entitled The Son of Zorro. Under Williams' influences, Lúpiz became interested in acting. He studied theater with Lito Cruz and Augusto Fernández and became good friends with director Alejandro Doria.

His first television roles were for the channel ATC in 1979. He went on to play leads in various telenovelas like Tramposa, El groncho y la dama and Pasiones. Beginning in 1990, Lúpiz starred in two seasons of the comedy series Detective de señoras. More recently, he has appeared in the Channel 13 telenovela Collar de esmeraldas (2006) and the fantasy film La luz del bosque (2008).

In 2000, Lúpiz began playing Zorro on stage in Argentina in the El Zorro play. He received four Sea Star Awards for his role as the masked vigilante in five additional Zorro plays.

Filmography

Television 

1979: Chantecler, ATC.
1980: Anastasia en la sombra,  ATC.
1982: La búsqueda, Canal 13.
1982: Cuando vuelvas a mí, Canal 13.
1984: Tramposa, Canal 13.
1984: Lucía Bonelli
1987: Mesa de noticias, ATC.
1987: El lobo, Canal 9.
1987: La cuñada.
1988: Pasiones.
1988–1989: Matrimonios y algo más, Canal 13.
1991: Detective de señoras, Canal 13.
1992: Mi socio imposible.
1993: Dos al toque, Telefé.
1994: Brigada Cola, Telefé.
1995: Aprender a volar, Canal 13.
1995: Por siempre mujercitas, Canal 9.
1996: Poliladron, Canal 13.
1997: Mamá x 2, Canal 9.
1997: Gane volando, ATC.
1998: Telesuerte, en Canal 9.
1999: ¡Trillizos, dijo la partera!
1994–2000: Susana Giménez (8 sketches) Telefé.
2000: Primicias (10 episodes) Canal 13.
2003: Soy gitano, Canal 13.
2003: Los simuladores, as himself
2003: Ensayo
2003–2004: El club del Zorro, Canal 13 (2003/2004).
2006: Collar de esmeraldas
2006: Doble filo

Film 
1982: Los pasajeros del jardín, directed by Alejandro Doria.
1982: El impenetrable, directed by Carlos Orgambide.
1988: El profesor punk, directed by Enrique Carreras.
2006: La luz del bosque
2018 Don't Cry for Me England

Theater
1984: En boca cerrada, directed by Agustín Alezzo
1988: Qué familia de locos, directed by Enrique Carreras
1990-1991: Matrimonios y algo más..., directed by Hugo Moser
1991: Mentirosos, with Claudio García Satur
1994: Brigada Cola, with Emilio Disi
1999: Las alegres mujeres de Shakespeare, directed by Claudio Hochman
2000–2001: El Zorro, directed by Claudio Hochman
2002: Vuelve el Zorro, directed by Claudio Hochman
2003: El Zorro y las monedas de oro, directed by Carlos Moreno.
2004: El Zorro III, la espada de la libertad, directed by Carlos Moreno.
2005–2006: La guarida del Zorro, el diamante de la corona, directed by Carlos Moreno
2005–2006: 5 gays.com, directed by Rafael Pence
2007: Mi mujer se llama Mauricio
2008: Mister Nueva York, directed by Carlos Evaristo
2009: El Zorro, el tesoro de la montaña azul
2015 The Canterville Ghost (producer)
2015: La jaula de las locas

References

External links
 

1953 births
Living people
Argentine male fencers
Olympic fencers of Argentina
Fencers at the 1972 Summer Olympics
Fencers at the 1976 Summer Olympics
Pan American Games medalists in fencing
Pan American Games silver medalists for Argentina
Pan American Games bronze medalists for Argentina
Male actors from Buenos Aires
Fencers at the 1975 Pan American Games
Fencers at the 1979 Pan American Games
Sportspeople from Buenos Aires
Medalists at the 1987 Pan American Games